Arqih (also Romanized as Ārqīh and Arghāy) is a village in Shahidabad Rural District, Central District, Avaj County, Qazvin Province, Iran. At the 2006 census, its population was 72, in 23 families.

References 

Populated places in Avaj County